Police FC is a football club from Kampala in Uganda.

History
They have won their first Ugandan league title in 2005 and the CECAFA Clubs Cup in 2006. Police was spurred on in the early years by Dennis Obua as a player and later as coach. During Obua's years, he managed to stage youthful players who have blossomed into really great talent. When Obua became the Federation of Uganda Football Association president, he hired Steven Mulinde to step in his shoes. Police saw tremendous growth and lately has been involved in several international ties. As of November 2019, the main stadium for Police FC is the Star Times Stadium. Located in the area of Lugogo. On 25 September, Tonny Mawejje was introduced  as the captain for Police FC.

Achievements
Ugandan Premier League: 1
 2005

CECAFA Clubs Cup: 1
 2006

Performance in CAF competitions
CAF Champions League: 1 appearance
2006 – Preliminary Round

CAF Cup Winners' Cup: 1 appearance
2003 – First Round

References

Police FC
Police association football clubs